Akgul Charievna Amanmuradova (born June 23, 1984) is an inactive professional tennis player from Uzbekistan. At 1.90 metres in height, she is one of the tallest female tennis players in history.

Amanmuradova has won two doubles titles on the WTA Tour, as well as ten singles and 16 doubles titles on the ITF Women's Circuit. On 26 May 2008, she reached her best singles ranking of world No. 50. On 18 January 2010, she peaked at No. 36 in the WTA doubles rankings.

Amanmuradova has twice reached the final of the Tashkent Open in her native Uzbekistan, losing in 2005 to Michaëlla Krajicek and in 2009 to Shahar Pe'er. She has also reached the final of the 2011 President's Cup in Nur-Sultan.

Career

2000–2006
Amanmuradova played her first WTA Tour match in her home town of Tashkent where she lost in the first round. She played her first ITF tournaments in 2002, and reached the semifinals in Mysore and finals in Manila and Hyderabad, both times losing to Sania Mirza.

2003 was a successful year for Amanmuradova; she won four singles titles, including a $25k tournament in Mumbai. She secured victories in Incheon, Pune and Mumbai. In August 2004, Amanmuradova won a $10k tournament in Coimbra, Portugal. She reached the semifinals in New Delhi and Mumbai and won two more titles in Pune and Bangkok. In 2005, she qualified for her first ever WTA Tour tournament in Pattaya City. She reached the semifinals in Phuket and Coimbra but her real success story came when she reached the final at the Tashkent Open. This run pushed her into the top 200 for the first time. Amanmuradova received a wild-card entry into the Australian Open, where she defeated Dally Randriantefy in three sets in the first round. In the second round, she faced 17th seed Daniela Hantuchová and was defeated in two sets.

Amanmuradova then tried to qualify for Pattaya City and Bangalore but lost in the qualifying tournaments. She represented Uzbekistan in the Fed Cup again, this time playing in the Asia/Oceania Group 1. She lost to Samantha Stosur of Australia and Mi Yoo of South Korea. Uzbekistan was made to play New Zealand in the relegation play-off and Amanmuradova was matched up against Marina Erakovic. She lost in straight sets and Uzbekistan was relegated.

Amanmuradova tried to qualify for Wimbledon, the French Open and the US Open, but lost in the qualifying tournaments. She returned to Tashkent but failed to replicate her run from the previous year, falling to Tamarine Tanasugarn in the first round. This meant she fell out of the top 200 for the first time in 2006.

In November, Amanmuradova played the Shanghai $50k tournament and defeated the first, third and fifth seeds to reach the final. Here she faced Tamarine Tanasugarn again, and again she was unable to defeat her. At the end of 2006, Amanmuradova reached the final at Pune, a tournament she had won two times before. However, she was forced to retire with a knee strain.

She ended the year with a 21–21 record and a ranking of 227.

2007–2009: Cincinnati Semifinalist and top 50 debut
Amanmuradova began the year by losing in the qualifying tournament at the Australian Open. This meant a significant drop in rankings as she had reached the second round in the previous year. In March, Amanmuradova headed to the $25k Mumbai tournament, which she won for the third time, dispatching Stefanie Vögele in the final.

At the French Open she managed to qualify by defeating María José Argeri, Evgeniya Rodina and Gréta Arn. In the first round she faced world No. 74, Vania King, whom she defeated in a tight match. In the second round Amanmuradova came up against world No. 10, Nicole Vaidišová, to whom she lost in two sets. This success boosted her ranking back into the top 200, and she reached a new career high of 141.

In July, Amanmuradova headed to Cincinnati. Here she managed to qualify and make it to the semifinals, defeating Bethanie Mattek along the way. However, she lost to Akiko Morigami in the semifinals, the same woman she had lost to in the fed cup five years prior. This success pushed her ranking up to 108. After another good performance in Tashkent, she moved into the top 100 for the first time. She ended the year with a record of 32–20 and a ranking of 97.

Amanmuradova began the year 2008 with a direct acceptance into the 2008 Australian Open, the first time she had ever been accepted straight into a grand slam. She lost in the first round to 26th seed Victoria Azarenka in two sets. Playing in the Fed Cup, Amanmuradova defeated Chan Yung-jan of Chinese Taipei and Tamarine Tanasugarn for a chance of promotion. However, she lost to Marina Erakovic of New Zealand in the promotion playoff.

At Pattaya City, Amanmuradova made it to the semifinals, losing to American Jill Craybas. After this, she rose to a career high of 85. In Berlin Amanmuradova managed to qualify for the premier event. After knocking out Aravane Rezaï of France, she faced world No. 2, Ana Ivanovic. This was the first time she had played a top five player. She held her own, pushing the first set to a tie-break before losing the match in straight sets.

Amanmuradova was playing some of her best tennis. At the 2008 İstanbul Cup, she made it to the semifinals, defeating Nadia Petrova en route. Here she fell to world No. 7, Elena Dementieva. After this she reached her highest ever ranking of World No. 50. For the rest of the year she didn't excel as much as previously. She made it to the second round of the French Open for the second year running. She represented Uzbekistan at the Beijing Olympics, losing to Francesca Schiavone in the first round. She ended the year with a 22–29 singles record and a ranking of 80.

Amanmuradova began the year 2009 by reaching the second round at the 2009 Australian Open, defeating Melanie Oudin in the first round before falling to María José Martínez Sánchez. Her ranking slipped throughout the year as she had little success on the WTA Tour. She went to play at the $100k Biarritz event and reached the semifinals, defeating world No. 86, Mathilde Johansson in the process, before falling to Julia Görges. The next week she reached another semifinal at a $50k tournament in Contrexéville.

She returned to the WTA Tour, but had little success until her home tournament, the Tashkent Open, where she reached her second WTA Tour final. She defeated Stefanie Vögele and Yaroslava Shvedova in straight sets en route to the final. In the final, she was defeated by Shahar Pe'er in two sets. Amanmuradova and partner Ai Sugiyama won the Aegon International at Eastbourne, the only WTA Premier event played on grass. She also won the $100k doubles tournament in Cuneo alongside Darya Kustova. She ended the 2009 season ranked 85 with a win–loss record of 25–27.

2010: French Open third round

Amanmuradova began the year with three consecutive losses in qualifying at the Brisbane International and the Sydney International. She followed this up with a first-round loss at the Australian Open to Croatian Karolina Šprem.

At the first round of the Pattaya Open, Amanmuradova was forced to retire with an abdominal strain whilst trailing Sabine Lisicki 6–0.
In doubles, she had a successful start to the year, reaching the semifinals of the Brisbane International alongside Chan Yung-jan. After this, she rose to her career high in doubles: No. 36.

Ammanmuradova then had some recent success in singles as she qualified for the Indian Wells Open after defeating Chanelle Scheepers and Patricia Mayr. However, in the first round she was defeated by Tsvetana Pironkova.

Amanmuradova then lost to Tsvetana Pironkova again the following week, this time in the first round of the qualifying draw of the Miami Open.
She then qualified for the main draw of the Italian Open by defeating Giulia Gatto-Monticone, and Chanelle Scheepers. She then lost to 12th seed Flavia Pennetta in the first round.

Amanmuradova then qualified for a Premier Mandatory Madrid Open, by defeating Roberta Vinci and Ayumi Morita. She again lost in the first round, this time to Alisa Kleybanova.
At the Warsaw Open, she was upset by world No. 537, Natalie Grandin, in the first round of the qualifying draw.

At the French Open, her ranking enabled her to be directly entered into the main draw. In the first round, she caused one of the biggest upsets of the day by defeating 20th seed and well established clay-court player María José Martínez Sánchez. She then defeated Johanna Larsson to move into the third round for the first time in her career. She then lost to Chanelle Scheepers in two sets.

Amanmuradova was unable to shift her good form onto the grass and suffered a first-round loss at the Eastbourne International to Craybas and a first-round loss at Wimbledon to Svetlana Kuznetsova.

At the Swedish Open, Amanmuradova defeated Mariana Duque Marino in the first round before falling to Barbora Záhlavová-Strýcová in the second.

Amanmuradova then suffered two more first-round losses. At the Italian Open, she was defeated again by Jill Craybas. She then lost in the first round of the İstanbul Cup to Sorana Cîrstea.

To begin preparations for the US Open, she entered the first tournament of the US Open Series, the San Diego Open. Her ranking was too low for her to gain direct entry into the main draw, so she had to qualify. She won her first qualifying match against Yurika Sema, but lost her second to Chanelle Scheepers.

Then, next tournament Amanmuradova entered was the Cincinnati Masters. Again, she had to qualify to enter the main draw, and she did so by defeating Anna Tatishvili and Varvara Lepchenko. In the first round of the main draw, she upset Japanese veteran Kimiko Date-Krumm. In the second round, she defeated Bojana Jovanovski to book a third-round encounter with top seed and world No. 2, Jelena Janković. Despite being 112 places below Janković in the rankings, Amanmuradova won to record her first ever top-5 win. She ran out of steam in the quarterfinals, losing to another Serbian, resurgent Ana Ivanovic in two sets.

At the US Open, Amanmuradova qualified by winning all three matches in the qualifying tournament. She defeated Dia Evtimova, Ryōko Fuda, and Valérie Tétreault. In the first round of the main draw, she defeated Chanelle Scheepers for the third time that year. Her run was ended by No. 31 seed Kaia Kanepi, in straight sets.

Amanmuradova gained direct entry into the Guangzhou International Open and defeated Olga Savchuk in the first round. She was defeated in straight sets by Sania Mirza in the second round.
Seeded No. 2 at her home tournament in Tashkent where she made the final in 2005 and 2009, Amanmuradova defeated Eirini Georgatou in the first round. In the second, she defeated American veteran Jill Craybas for the first time, in three sets. In the quarterfinals, she was defeated in straight sets by No. 7 seed Alla Kudryavtseva.

She ended the year in the top 100 for the fourth year in a row with a ranking of 70.

2011–2013
Amanmuradova failed to win a single match in Australia, losing in the first round of the Brisbane International, the Hobart International and the Australian Open.

She won her first match of the season in Pattaya, Thailand, competing at the Pattaya Open where she defeated seventh seed Zheng Jie in the first round. She then defeated Chanelle Scheepers to book a quarterfinal place against No. 4 seed Daniela Hantuchová. Her run ended, however, after a drubbing by Hantuchová.

She then competed at the Dubai Tennis Championships, but lost in the first round to wildcard receiver Sania Mirza.

Amanmuradova started off the 2012 season falling in the qualifying draws of both Brisbane and the Australian Open. She then represented Uzbekistan at the 2012 Fed Cup in Shenzhen, China. She won her singles match against Ayu Fani Damayanti, but lost both doubles matches.

Amanmuradova then lost early in Pattaya and Kuala Lumpur, to Vera Zvonareva and Agnieszka Radwańska, respectively. She failed to qualify for the Premier Mandatory tournaments in Indian Wells and Miami, and also lost in the first round at Osprey.

As the clay-court season began, she managed to make it to the main draw of Charleston, but was beaten by Jill Craybas. She was given a lucky loser spot in Stuttgart where she upset Dominika Cibulková in round one, her biggest win since 2010. However, she could not hold on to the good form, as she lost early in Budapest, Cagnes-sur-Mer and Prague. She was also beaten in the qualifications at Roland Garros.

On grass, she lost in round one at the Rosmalen Open. She also lost in the first round of 2012 Wimbledon Championships, to Petra Kvitová in straight sets.

2019–2022
As of 2019, she was playing on the ITF Circuit. She won her first title since 2014 at the $25k event at Almaty in September, defeating Valeriya Yushchenko in the final.

Grand Slam performance timelines

Singles

Doubles

WTA career finals

Singles: 2 (2 runner-ups)

Doubles: 4 (2 titles, 2 runner-ups)

ITF Circuit finals

Singles: 20 (10 titles, 10 runner–ups)

Doubles: 47 (16 titles, 31 runner–ups)

Notes

References

External links
 
 
 
 
 
 
 Akgul Amanmuradova – official site

1984 births
Living people
Uzbekistani people of Turkmenistani descent
Uzbekistani female tennis players
Tennis players at the 2008 Summer Olympics
Olympic tennis players of Uzbekistan
Sportspeople from Tashkent
Asian Games medalists in tennis
Tennis players at the 2006 Asian Games
Tennis players at the 2010 Asian Games
Tennis players at the 2014 Asian Games
Tennis players at the 2018 Asian Games
Asian Games silver medalists for Uzbekistan
Asian Games bronze medalists for Uzbekistan
Medalists at the 2006 Asian Games
Medalists at the 2010 Asian Games
Universiade medalists in tennis
Universiade bronze medalists for Uzbekistan
Medalists at the 2003 Summer Universiade